Toona, commonly known as redcedar, toon (also spelled tun) or toona, tooni (in India) is a genus in the mahogany family, Meliaceae, native from Afghanistan south to India, and east to North Korea, Papua New Guinea and eastern Australia. In older texts, the genus was often incorporated within a wider circumscription of the related genus Cedrela, but that genus is now restricted to species from the Americas.

Uses

Ornamental use
Toona sinensis is of interest as by far the most cold-tolerant species in the Meliaceae, native in China as far north as 40°N in the Beijing area, where its tender shoots, called xiangchun, are a traditional local leaf vegetable. It is the only member of the family that can be cultivated successfully in northern Europe, where it is sometimes planted as an ornamental tree in parks and avenues. Until recently, it had no widespread English common name, though Chinese Mahogany (reflecting its botanical relationship) is now used (e.g. Rushforth 1999).

Wood source
Toona ciliata is an important timber tree. It provides a valuable hardwood used for furniture, ornamental panelling, shipbuilding, and musical instruments like the sitar, rudra veena, and drums. Due to the restrictions in recent years on the use of natively-grown American mahogany, it has become one of the common mahogany replacements in electric guitar manufacturing.

Medicinal and culinary uses
Toona sinensis is used in Chinese traditional medicine and eaten as a vegetable or sauce in China (leaves and shoots).

Species
The following include accepted species in the Plant List:
Toona australis (F. Muell.) Harms
Toona calantas Merr. & Rolfe – kalantas, Philippine mahogany, Philippine cedar
Toona ciliata M.Roem. (syn. T. australis) – Australian red cedar, Indian mahogany
Toona fargesii A. Chev. – hong hua xiang chun
Toona sinensis (A.Juss.) M.Roem. – Chinese mahogany or Chinese toon
Toona sureni (Blume) Merr. (syn. T. febrifuga) – Suren, Indonesian mahogany, Vietnamese mahogany

References

External links
University of Melbourne: Sorting Toona names
New England, The Wilderness Society, Armidale Branch
New South Wales Flora Online
 

 
Meliaceae genera